Leucopogon cryptanthus, commonly known as small-flowered leucopogon, is a species of flowering plant in the heath family Ericaceae and is endemic to the south-west of Western Australia. The few flowers are small and inconspicuous, arranged singly, in short spikes or in clusters at the ends of branches in cymes with leaf-like bracts and bracteoles at the base.

The species was first formally described in 1868 by George Bentham in Flora Australiensis from specimens collected by James Drummond in the Swan River Colony.
The specific epithet (cryptanthus) means "hidden-flowered".

Leucopogon crassiflorus is listed as extinct under the Australian Government Environment Protection and Biodiversity Conservation Act 1999.

References

crassiflorus
Ericales of Australia
Flora of Western Australia
Plants described in 1868
Taxa named by George Bentham